The following is an alphabetical list of members of the United States House of Representatives from the state of Ohio.  For chronological tables of members of both houses of the United States Congress from the state (through the present day), see United States congressional delegations from Ohio. The list of names should be complete as of January 2019, but other data may be incomplete.

Current representatives 
Last updated January, 2023
 : Greg Landsman (D) (since 2023)
 : Brad Wenstrup (R) (since 2013)
 : Joyce Beatty (D) (since 2013)
 : Jim Jordan (R) (since 2007)
 : Bob Latta (R) (since 2007)
 : Bill Johnson (R) (since 2011)
 : Max Miller (R) (since 2023)
 : Warren Davidson (R) (since 2016)
 : Marcy Kaptur (D) (since 1983)
 : Mike Turner (R) (since 2003)
 : Shontel Brown (D) (since 2021)
 : Troy Balderson (R) (since 2018)
 : Emilia Sykes (D) (since 2023)
 : David Joyce (R) (since 2013)
 : Mike Carey (R) (since 2021)

List of members of the U.S. House of Representatives

See also

List of United States senators from Ohio
United States congressional delegations from Ohio
Ohio's congressional districts

References

Ohio
 
United States House of representatives